Steven James Bourgeois (born August 4, 1972), is a former professional baseball pitcher. He batted and threw right-handed. Bourgeois had a 1–3 record, with a 6.30 ERA, in 15 games, in his one-year career. He was drafted by the Giants in the 21st round of the 1993 draft.

Due to his participation as a replacement player during the 1994 Major League Baseball strike, he was not eligible to join the MLB Players Union.

External links

1972 births
Living people
American expatriate baseball players in Mexico
Baseball players from Louisiana
Baton Rouge Riverbats players
Clinton LumberKings players
Colorado Springs Sky Sox players
Everett Giants players
Hinds Eagles baseball players
Houma Hawks players
Major League Baseball pitchers
Mexican League baseball pitchers
People from Lutcher, Louisiana
Phoenix Firebirds players
San Francisco Giants players
San Jose Giants players
Saraperos de Saltillo players
Shreveport Captains players